Gawthorpe is a village to the north of Ossett, in the Wakefield district, in the county of West Yorkshire, England. It is roughly midway between Wakefield and Dewsbury north of the A638.

Gawthorpe's name derives from Gorky, a Viking name, and thorpe was a settlement, but evidence suggests the village may have Roman origins. Gawthorpe's Mayday celebrations date back to at least 1875 when a seventy-foot fir tree was bought and erected by public subscription on the village green. The maypole was last replaced in 1986.

Gawthorpe Water Tower is a Grade II listed concrete structure built between 1922 and 1928 to store drinking water for the Ossett area. The 55m tall tower is a prominent local landmark of the Ossett and Gawthorpe area.

Gawthorpe hosts the World Coal Carrying Championships. The Championships were originally run from the Shaw Cross colliery to the May Pole, although the collieries in this area all closed in the Robens era. It also gives its name to the Gawthorpe seam of coal, which stretches from the village down through Horbury and Crigglestone.

See also
Listed buildings in Ossett

References

Villages in West Yorkshire
Geography of the City of Wakefield
Ossett
Novelty running